Jessica Tudos (born 4 April 1969) is a Canadian gymnast. She competed in six events at the 1984 Summer Olympics.

References

External links
 

1969 births
Living people
Canadian female artistic gymnasts
Olympic gymnasts of Canada
Gymnasts at the 1984 Summer Olympics
Gymnasts from Toronto